The 30th Cannes Film Festival was held from 13 to 27 May 1977. The Palme d'Or went to the Padre Padrone by Paolo and Vittorio Taviani. A new non-competitive section, "Le Passé composé", is held at this festival only and focuses on compilations. This section, along with sections "Les Yeux fertiles" and "L'Air du temps" of the previous two years, were integrated into Un Certain Regard in 1978.

The festival opened with The Bishop's Bedroom, directed by Dino Risi and closed with Slap Shot, directed by George Roy Hill.

Jury 
The following people were appointed as the Jury of the 1977 feature film competition:

Feature films
Roberto Rossellini (Italy) Jury President
N'Sougan Agblemagnon (author)
Anatole Dauman (France)
Jacques Demy (France)
Carlos Fuentes (Mexico)
Benoîte Groult (France)
Pauline Kael (USA) (journalist)
Marthe Keller (Switzerland)
Yuri Ozerov (Soviet Union)

Official selection

In competition - Feature film
The following feature films competed for the Palme d'Or:

3 Women by Robert Altman
The American Friend (Der Amerikanische Freund) by Wim Wenders
An Average Little Man (Un borghese piccolo piccolo) by Mario Monicelli
Backbone (Kičma) by Vlatko Gilić
Bang! by Jan Troell
Black Joy by Anthony Simmons
Bound for Glory by Hal Ashby
Budapest Tales (Budapesti mesék) by István Szabó
Car Wash by Michael Schultz
The Duellists by Ridley Scott
Elisa, vida mía by Carlos Saura
Group Portrait with a Lady (Gruppenbild mit Dame) by Aleksandar Petrović
The Hunters (Oi kynigoi) by Theodoros Angelopoulos
Iphigenia by Michael Cacoyannis
J.A. Martin Photographer by Jean Beaudin
The Lacemaker (La dentellière) by Claude Goretta
The Lorry (Le camion) by Marguerite Duras
The Old Country Where Rimbaud Died (Le Vieux pays où Rimbaud est mort) by Jean Pierre Lefebvre
Padre Padrone by Paolo and Vittorio Taviani
The Purple Taxi (Un taxi mauve) by Yves Boisset
Solemn Communion (La Communion solennelle) by René Féret
A Special Day (Una giornata particolare) by Ettore Scola
Wounded Game (Podranki) by Nikolai Gubenko

Films out of competition
The following films were selected to be screened out of competition:

 Aïda by Pierre Jourdan
 All This and World War II by Susan Winslow (United States)
 Beethoven - Tage aus einem Leben by Horst Seemann (East Germany)
 La Bible by Marcel Carné (France) (documentary)
 The Bishop's Bedroom (La stanza del vescovo) by Dino Risi (Italy, France)
 Black Shadows on a Silver Screen  by Ray Hubbard (United States)
 Bogart by Marshall Flaum (United States)
 Camelamos Naquerar (short) by Miguel Alcobendas (Spain)
 Carrara by Christian Paureilhe (France)
 Catherine by Paul Seban (France)
 The Children of Theatre Street (doc.) by Robert Dornhelm (United States)
 Cine Folies (documentary) by Philippe Collin (France)
 Un Cuore Semplice by Giorgio Ferrara (Italy)
 Dearest Executioners (Queridísimos verdugos) by Basilio M. Patino (Spain)
 Des femmes et des nanas by Jean Pierre Marchand (France)
 Il gabbiano by Marco Bellocchio (Italy)
 Ha-Gan by Victor Nord (Israel)
 Harlan County, USA (doc.) by Barbara Kopple (United States)
  by Helma Sanders-Brahms (West Germany)
 Les Lieux d'une fugue by Georges Perec (France) (short)
 Life Goes to the Movies (doc.) by Mel Stuart (United States)
 Mais qu'est ce qu'elles veulent? (doc.) by Coline Serreau (France)
 Meanwhile Back at the Ranch by Richard Patterson (United States)
 Moi Tintin (doc.) by Gérard Valet, Henri Roanne (France, Belgium)
 Mozart - Aufzeichnungen einer Jugend by Klaus Kirschner (West Germany)
 El mundo de Pau Casals by Jean Baptiste Bellsolell (Spain)
 The Naked Civil Servant by Jack Gold (United Kingdom)
 News from Home by Chantal Akerman (France)
 One Man by Robin Spry (Canada)
 Paradistorg by Gunnel Lindblom (Sweden)
 The Passionate Industry (doc.) by Joan Long (Australia)
 The Pictures That Moved (doc.) by Paul Andersen (Australia)
 Le Portrait de Dorian Gray by Pierre Boutron (France)
 Pumping Iron (doc.) by George Butler, Robert Fiore (United States)
 Le ragioni del successo by Luca Verdone (Italy)
 Raoni (doc.) by Jean-Pierre Dutilleux (France, Belgium, Brazil)
 Rhinoceros by Tom O'Horgan (United States, United Kingdom, Canada)
 Le Roi Pelé (doc.) by François Reichenbach (France)
 San Gottardo by Villi Hermann (Switzerland)
 Scott Joplin by Jeremy Paul Kagan (United States)
 Slap Shot by George Roy Hill (United States)
 That's Action by G. David Schine (documentary) (United States) 
 Torre Bela by Thomas Harlan (Italy, Portugal)
 An Unfinished Piece for Mechanical Piano by Nikita Mikhalkov (Soviet Union)
 La vie au ralenti by Jean-Christophe Rose (France)

Short film competition
The following short films competed for the Short Film Palme d'Or:

Arte tairona by Francisco Norden
Di Cavalcanti by Glauber Rocha
Envisage by Peter Foldes
Küzdök by Marcell Jankovics
Mao, by himself (Mao par lui-même) by René Viénet
Rumble by Jules Engel
Stille Post by Ivan Steiger

Parallel sections

International Critics' Week
The following feature films were screened for the 16th International Critics' Week (16e Semaine de la Critique):

 Ben et Benedict by Paula Delsol (France)
 Caminandos pasos… Caminando by Federico Weingartshofer (Mexico)
 Ethnocide by Paul Leduc (Canada, Mexico)
 Liebe dans leben by Lutz Eisholz (West Germany)
 Le Meurtrier de la jeunesse by Kazuhizo Hasegawa (Japan)
 Omar Gatlato by Merzak Allouache (Algeria)
 Twenty Days Without War by Aleksey German (Soviet Union)

Directors' Fortnight
The following films were screened for the 1977 Directors' Fortnight (Quinzaine des Réalizateurs):

 25 by Jose Celso Correa, Celso Luccas (Mozambique)
 Aftenlandet by Peter Watkins (Denmark)
 Ceddo by Ousmane Sembene (Senegal)
 Closet Children (Les enfants du placard) by Benoît Jacquot (France)
 The Devil Probably (Le diable probablement) by Robert Bresson (France)
 The Earth Is Flat (Erasmus Montanus Eller Jorden er flad) by Henrik Stangerup (Denmark)
 Fuera de aquí! by Jorge Sanjinés (Ecuador)
 Gizmo! by Howard Smith (United States)
 La Historia Me Absolvera by Gaetano Pagano (Sweden)
 The Hyena's Sun (Soleil des hyènes) by Ridha Behi (Netherlands, Tunisia)
 The Indians Are Still Far Away (Les indiens sont encore loin) by Patricia Moraz (France, Switzerland)
 Kilenc hónap by Marta Meszaros (Hungary)
 Living On (Continuar a Viver) (doc.) by António da Cunha Telles (Portugal)
 La muerte de Sebastián Arache y su pobre entierro by Nicolas Sarquis (Argentina)
 Near and Far Away (Långt borta och nära) by Marianne Ahrne (Sweden)
 Nós por cá Todos Bem by Fernando Lopes (Portugal)
 Ors Zein by Khaled Siddik (Kuwait, Sudan)
 Peking Duck Soup (Chinois, encore un effort pour être révolutionnaires) (doc.) by René Vienet (France)
 Prata Palomares by André Faria (Brazil)
 Why Shoot the Teacher? by Silvio Narizzano (Canada)
 Zero Hour (Stunde Null) by Edgar Reitz (West Germany)

Short films

 Claude Chauvy, l'art du tournage en bois by Jean-Pierre Bonneau (France)
 Eggs by John Hubley (United States)
 Hors-jeu by Georges Schwisgebel (Switzerland)
 Nights (Nyhtes) by Georges Katakouzinos (Greece)
 Sauf dimanches et fêtes by François Ode (France)
 Windy Day by John Hubley, Faith Hubley (United States)

Awards

Official awards
The following films and people received the 1977 Official selection awards:
Palme d'Or: Padre Padrone by Paolo and Vittorio Taviani
Best Actress: 
Shelley Duvall for 3 Women
Monique Mercure for J.A. Martin photographe
Best Actor: Fernando Rey for Elisa, vida mía
Best First Work: The Duellists by Ridley Scott (Unanimously)
Best Music: Norman Whitfield for Car Wash
Short films
Short Film Palme d'Or: Küzdök by Marcell Jankovics
 Jury Prize: Di Cavalcanti by Glauber Rocha

Independent awards
FIPRESCI
 FIPRESCI Prize:
 Padre Padrone by Paolo and Vittorio Taviani (In competition)
 Kilenc hónap by Marta Meszaros (Directors' Fortnight)
Commission Supérieure Technique
Technical Grand Prize: Car Wash by Michael Schultz
Ecumenical Jury
 Prize of the Ecumenical Jury:
The Lacemaker (La dentellière) by Claude Goretta
J.A. Martin Photographer by Jean Beaudin

References

Media
INA: Opening of the 1977 festival (commentary in French)
INA: Assessment of the 1977 Cannes festival (interview with France Roche in French)
INA: Critics' reactions to the 1977 awards (commentary in French)

External links 
1977 Cannes Film Festival (web.archive)
Official website Retrospective 1977 
Cannes Film Festival:1977  at Internet Movie Database

Cannes Film Festival, 1977
Cannes Film Festival, 1977
Cannes Film Festival